Camporelli or biscotti Camporelli, is a light biscuit made with three ingredients--flour, sugar, and eggs--and then baked twice. They are characterized by their round, long shape, crispy edges, and golden color, as well as the lack of fat, such as butter. They are used in various tiramisu recipes, served with ice cream or eaten alone.

History

The predecessor of biscotti Camporelli was the biscottini di Novara, created by the nuns of the area and given to the clergy as gifts. Biscotti Camporelli was developed by Luigi Camporelli in Novara in 1852, resuming the previous tradition and commercializing it, selling it in the family bakery.

See also
 List of Italian desserts and pastries
 Italian cuisine
 Ladyfinger (biscuit)

References

Biscuits
Italian pastries